The Gnifetti Hut (Italian: Capanna Giovanni Gnifetti) is a refuge in the Alps in Aosta Valley, Italy.

The refuge is named after Italian mountaineer and parish priest from Alagna Valsesia, Giovanni Gnifetti.

References

External links
Official website

Mountain huts in the Alps
Mountain huts in Aosta Valley
Gressoney-La-Trinité